Yuliya Nikolaevna Chizhenko-Fomenko (born 30 August 1979) is a Russian middle-distance runner who specializes in the 1500 metres.

At the 2005 World Championships she originally finished in silver medal position behind Tatyana Tomashova, but was disqualified for obstructing Maryam Yusuf Jamal of Bahrain. The next year Chizhenko won the World Indoor Championships before finishing second at the 2006 European Athletics Championships, again behind Tomashova.

Fomenko was chosen to represent Russia at the 2008 Summer Olympics, but has since been suspended from competition due to doping test irregularities, along with six other Russian athletes, including Tomashova and Yelena Soboleva.

On 20 October 2008, it was announced that Fomenko and six other Russian athletes would receive two-year doping bans for manipulating drug samples.

International competitions

Personal bests
 800 metres – 1:57.07 (2006)
 1500 metres – 3:55.68 (2006)
 3000 metres – 9:01.22 (2003)

See also
List of doping cases in athletics
Doping at the Olympic Games
List of European Athletics Championships medalists (women)
1500 metres at the World Championships in Athletics
Russia at the World Athletics Championships
Doping at the World Athletics Championships

References

External links

1979 births
Living people
Sportspeople from Arkhangelsk
Russian female middle-distance runners
World Athletics Indoor Championships winners
European Athletics Championships medalists
Russian Athletics Championships winners
Doping cases in athletics
Russian sportspeople in doping cases